Johannes Hermannes Jozefus (Hans) van den Hende (Groningen, January 9, 1964) is a Dutch Roman Catholic clergyman. He was appointed bishop of the diocese of Breda on October 31, 2007. On 10 May 2011, pope Benedict XVI appointed him bishop of the diocese of Rotterdam.

Van den Hende attended the local secondary school in Haren. He studied philosophy and theology at the Catholic University of Utrecht. At the Gregorianum in Rome he obtained a doctorate of Canon Law with a dissertation that focused of the changing role of episcopal conferences since the Second Vatican Council. He was ordained to the priesthood in 1991.

From 2000 Van den Hende served as vicar general for the diocese of Groningen-Leeuwarden. In 2007 pope Benedict XVI appointed him bishop of Breda. He is the youngest member of the Dutch episcopal conference.

References

Sources
Hans van den Hende on www.catholic-hierarchy.org
 Bisschop Van den Hende weet wat hij wil, Katholiek Nieuwsblad, 15 September 2006
 Hans van den Hende 'Je moet nooit op je voorganger willen lijken'

1964 births
Living people
21st-century Roman Catholic bishops in the Netherlands
Roman Catholic Diocese of Rotterdam
People from Groningen (city)
Pontifical Gregorian University alumni